Rocco Rodio (c. 1535 – 1607) was an Italian Renaissance composer and theorist, best known for his sacred works and keyboard ricercares.

Biography
He was born in Bari and apparently led a cosmopolitan life, at some point working at the Polish court, and then possibly settling in Naples. Popular among his colleagues, Rodio was a member of Carlo Gesualdo's academy at Naples, organized a Camerata di Propaganda per l'Affinamento del Gusto Musicale together with other Neapolitan musicians, and also probably cultivated connections with Polish and Spanish composers.

Rodio's work, both in music and in music theory, was progressive for its time and shows a competent composer. His treatise Regole di musica circulated widely both in Italy and outside its borders. Rodio's Libro primo di ricercate (1575) is the earliest surviving keyboard music notated in score. It contains five ricercars and four fantasias, all marked with a highly individual harmonic language. This print, together with Antonio Valente's Intavolatura de cimbalo, represents the earliest works of the so-called Neapolitan school, to which later important composers such as Ascanio Mayone and Giovanni Maria Trabaci belonged.

List of works

Music
 Missarum decem liber primus, masses for 4–6 voices (Rome, 1562)
 Libro primo di ricercate, keyboard works (Naples, 1575)
 Il secondo libro di madrigali, madrigals for 4 voices (Venice, 1587)
 Duetti (1589), lost
 Il primo libro di madrigali, lost
 canzonas, motets, and other pieces in manuscript copies

Writings
 Regole di musica di Rocco Rodio sotto brevissime risposte ad alcuni dubij propostigli da un cavaliero, intorno alle varie opinioni de contrapontisti con la dimostratione de tutti i canoni sopra il canto fermo (Naples, 1600)

References
 Apel, Willi. 1972. The History of Keyboard Music to 1700. Translated by Hans Tischler. Indiana University Press. . Originally published as Geschichte der Orgel- und Klaviermusik bis 1700 by Bärenreiter-Verlag, Kassel.

Composers for pipe organ
Italian classical composers
Italian male classical composers
Renaissance composers
People from Bari
Year of death unknown
Year of birth uncertain